The 2021 South Dakota Coyotes football team represented the University of South Dakota in the 2021 NCAA Division I FCS football season. The Coyotes competed as members of the Missouri Valley Football Conference and were led by sixth-year head coach Bob Nielson. They played their home games at the DakotaDome in Vermillion, South Dakota.

Schedule

Game Summaries

at Kansas

References

South Dakota
South Dakota Coyotes football seasons
2021 NCAA Division I FCS playoff participants
South Dakota Coyotes football